Ignacio Manuel Altamirano Basilio (13 November 1834 – 13 February 1893) was a Mexican radical liberal writer, journalist, teacher and politician. He wrote Clemencia (1869), which is often considered to be the first modern Mexican novel.

Biography

Altamirano was born in Tixtla, Guerrero, of indigenous Chontal heritage. His father was the mayor of Tixtla, this allowed Ignacio to attend school there. He later studied in Toluca thanks to a scholarship that was granted him by Ignacio Ramírez, of whom he was a disciple.

As a liberal politician, Altamirano opposed Benito Juárez's continuation in office in 1861, allying himself with other liberal foes of Juárez and supporting Jesús González Ortega. With the French invasion of Mexico in 1862, Altamirano understood how dire the situation was for Mexico, since unlike the U.S. invasion (1846–48), which united Mexicans against the invader, the French were supported by Mexican conservatives. His best-known novel is El Zarco, which is set in Yautepec, Morelos during the Reform War of 1857–1860. It tells the story of an honorable and courageous Indian blacksmith who falls in love with a haughty village girl, only to have her elope with the cold-blooded bandit, "Zarco Blue Eyes."

He founded several newspapers and magazines including El Correo de México ("The Mexico Post"), El Renacimiento ("The Renaissance") (1869), El Federalista ("The Federalist"), La Tribuna ("The Tribune") and La República ("The Republic").

Altamirano was president of the Sociedad Mexicana de Geografía y Estadística (Mexican Society for Geography and Statistics) from 1881 to 1889. He was also public prosecutor, magistrate and president of the Supreme Court, as well as senior officer of the Ministry of Public Works and the Economy.

He died in San Remo, Italy, in 1893.

Bibliography 

La literatura nacional (1849)
Clemencia (1869), Ed.Elibros, ebook. 
Crónicas de la semana (1869)
La Navidad en las montañas (1871), ebook, Ed.Elibros ISBN CDLPG00010825 
Antonia (1872)
Beatriz (1873)
Atenea
Cuentos de invierno (1880)
Rimas (1880)
El Zarco (written 1885–1889, published 1901), Ed. Siglo XXI, México.  (posthumous)
Paisajes y leyendas, tradiciones y costumbres de México (1886)
Obras (1899)

Further reading
Nacci, Chris N. Ignacio Manuel Altamirano. New York: Twayne Publishers 1970.

See also
List of people from Morelos, Mexico

References

Auto-translated Bio at mexicodesconocido.com.mx ("Unknown Mexico" website)

External links 
 
 
 
 The audiobook Clemencia can be downloaded from Leer Escuchando 

19th-century Mexican writers
Liberalism in Mexico
Mexican male novelists
19th-century Mexican poets
Mexican male poets
Writers from Guerrero
Members of the Chamber of Deputies (Mexico)
Mexican jurists
Mexican diplomats
19th-century Mexican journalists
Male journalists
Mexican soldiers
Nahua people
1893 deaths
1834 births
19th-century Mexican novelists
19th-century male writers